Cowlington is a town in LeFlore County, Oklahoma. It is part of the Fort Smith metropolitan area. The population was 155 at the time of the 2010 census, a gain of 16.5 percent over the figure of 133 recorded in 2000.

History
The fertile soil of the Arkansas River bottom land, in which the present town of Cowlington is located, attracted settlement as soon as the Choctaw tribe migrated to Indian Territory. Many of these inhabitants fled during the American Civil War, returning only when hostilities had ceased. White men also came after the war and began leasing land. Among these were Coke and Fowler Cowling. A settlement formed that was informally known as Short Mountain. A post office named Cowlington, to honor the Cowling family, opened in the community in 1884.

At the time of its founding, Cowlington was located in the Moshulatubbee District of the Choctaw Nation.

Cowlington's economy was largely based on agricultural services. Area production included wheat, potatoes, cotton, and livestock. The town prospered because of its access to the steamboat trade on the river. Two floods along the Arkansas River, in 1898 and 1904, devastated the local economy, but the town recovered each time. However, railroads built lines through LeFlore County in the late 1800s, and began to supplant the steamboats. Fowler Cowlington tried to convince some of the railroads to build a track through Cowlington, but failed in this effort. More residents began to move away. {{efn|Even Fowler Cowlington decided to sell his land and moved to Pittsburg County, Oklahoma. The onset of the Great Depression caused many other people to move away, as well.

Construction of the Robert S. Kerr Lock and Dam between 1964 and 1970 coincided with a large increase in Cowlington's population to a high of 751 residents at the 1970 U. S. Census. Tourism became a significant portion of the local economy, although the population declined again after construction was completed.

Geography
Cowlington is located at  (35.307146, -94.791413).

Demographics

As of the census of 2000, there were 133 people, 55 households, and 38 families residing in the town. The racial makeup of the town was 74.44% White, 8.27% Native American, 3.76% from other races, and 13.53% from two or more races. Hispanic or Latino of any race were 3.76% of the population.

There were 55 households, out of which 27.3% had children under the age of 18 living with them, 52.7% were married couples living together, 9.1% had a female householder with no husband present, and 30.9% were non-families. 30.9% of all households were made up of individuals, and 16.4% had someone living alone who was 65 years of age or older. The average household size was 2.42 and the average family size was 3.03.

In the town, the population was spread out, with 27.8% under the age of 18, 7.5% from 18 to 24, 27.1% from 25 to 44, 19.5% from 45 to 64, and 18.0% who were 65 years of age or older. The median age was 36 years. For every 100 females, there were 95.6 males. For every 100 females age 18 and over, there were 95.9 males.

The median income for a household in the town was $16,591, and the median income for a family was $19,167. Males had a median income of $16,875 versus $23,125 for females. The per capita income for the town was $9,323. There were 6.3% of families and 9.6% of the population living below the poverty line, including no under eighteens and 8.7% of those over 64.

References

External links
  Encyclopedia of Oklahoma History and Culture - Cowlington
 Oklahoma Digital Maps: Digital Collections of Oklahoma and Indian Territory

Towns in LeFlore County, Oklahoma
Towns in Oklahoma
Fort Smith metropolitan area
Oklahoma populated places on the Arkansas River
Populated places established in 1884
1884 establishments in Indian Territory